Margriet van den Broek (born 30 March 1974) is a Dutch wheelchair racer. In 2018, she won the gold medal in the women's 800 metres T54 event at the 2018 World Para Athletics European Championships held in Berlin, Germany. She also won the silver medal in the women's 5000 metres T54 event and the bronze medal in the women's 1500 metres T54 event.

In 2014, van den Broek won the silver medal in the women's 100 metres T54 event at the 2014 IPC Athletics European Championships held in Swansea, Wales, United Kingdom. In the same year, she also won the silver medal in the women's wheelchair race at the 2014 Berlin Marathon held in Berlin, Germany.

In 2015, she won the bronze medal in both the women's 400 metres T54 and women's 800 metres T54 events at the 2015 IPC Athletics World Championships held in Doha, Qatar.

In 2019, she finished in 4th place in the women's wheelchair race at the 2019 Tokyo Marathon in Tokyo, Japan. In 2020, she finished in 5th place in the women's wheelchair race at the 2020 London Marathon in London, United Kingdom.

References

External links
 

1974 births
Living people
Place of birth missing (living people)
Dutch female wheelchair racers
Athletes (track and field) at the 2016 Summer Paralympics
Paralympic athletes of the Netherlands
20th-century Dutch women
21st-century Dutch women